Frederica Academy is an independent, coeducational, college preparatory school located on Saint Simons Island, Georgia, United States. It serves students from grades Pre-K to 12. The school has a fully functional lower school, middle school, and upper school. The current head of school is Scott L. Hutchinson.

Campus life

Athletics 
Frederica also offers many athletic opportunities including Baseball, Basketball, Cheerleading, Football, Cross Country, Golf, Soccer, Swimming, Tennis, Track & Field, and Volleyball.

Clubs and organizations 
Frederica Academy offers a multitude of school sponsored clubs and organizations, including:

 Adventure Club
 Advisory Mentor Program
 Ambassador Club
 Art Club
 Chess Club
 Creative Writing Club
 Cultural Awareness Club
 Debate Club
 Dinosaur Club
 Fellowship of Christian Athletes (FCA)
 The FRED Theater Company
 Homework Helper
 Honor Council
 Humane Society Teen Board

 Innovation Meets Entrepreneurship
 JV Math Team
 Nightingales
 Model United Nations
 Mythology Club
 National Honor Society (NHS)
 The Obsidian (Literary Magazine)
 Science Bowl Team
 Service Council
 STEM Club
 Student Council
 Varsity Math Team
 World Language & Culture Club

History 

Founded in 1969, Frederica has a long history of educating students from the Golden Isles of Georgia. Originally, the school was located in the old Brunswick Hospital on the mainland while construction of today's campus was taking place on St. Simons Island. The original buildings still hold the lower and middle schools. In 2004, construction finished on the state-of-the-art new upper school building, Lovick P. Corn Hall.

Advanced Placement courses
The school offers a number of Advanced Placement courses, including Language and Composition, Literature and Composition, Calculus AB, Calculus BC, Statistics, Chemistry, Physics I, Computer Science A, World History, US History, US Government, Comparative Government, and Spanish Language.

Facilities 

Frederica Academy has a large campus that features one lower school building, two middle school buildings (Benefield Hall and Fleming Hall), a fifth grade hall, one upper school building (Corn Hall), a fully equipped gymnasium, cafeteria (Hamilton Hall), drama theater, basketball court, soccer field, baseball field, lower school media center , Been Library, administration building, a wet and dry science laboratory, and a full art studio.

References

External links 
 Frederica Academy's homepage

Preparatory schools in Georgia (U.S. state)
Schools in Glynn County, Georgia
Private high schools in Georgia (U.S. state)
Private middle schools in Georgia (U.S. state)
Private elementary schools in Georgia (U.S. state)
Educational institutions established in 1969
1969 establishments in Georgia (U.S. state)